Teotônio Brandão Vilela Filho  (Viçosa, Alagoas, January 29, 1951) is a Brazilian economist, politician and Governor of Alagoas from 2007 to 2015. He graduated at the Universidade de Brasília and then specialized in Business Administration at the Fundação Getúlio Vargas. He is a son of Alagoas couple Teotônio Brandão Vilela and Lenita Quintela. Brandão Vilela's degree in economics from the University of Brasilia (UNB), majoring in Business Administration from Fundação Getúlio Vargas (FGV).

He is one of the sons of the former senator Teôtonio Vilela, and was one of the founders of the PSDB. In 1986, he won his first Senate elections, becoming, at the time, the youngest senator to ever take office in Brazil. He was reelected for that in 1994 and 2002. In 2006 he was elected the governor of Alagoas, being reelected in 2010.

References 

Living people
1951 births
Governors of Alagoas
Brazilian Social Democracy Party politicians
Members of the Federal Senate (Brazil)
Honorary Knights Commander of the Order of the British Empire